Rasbora lacrimula is a species of ray-finned fish in the genus Rasbora from Borneo.

References 

Rasboras
Freshwater fish of Borneo
Taxa named by Renny Kurnia Hadiaty
Taxa named by Maurice Kottelat
Fish described in 2009